Betsy Nagelsen and Elizabeth Smylie were the defending champions but they competed with different partners that year, Nagelsen with Lori McNeil and Smylie with Jana Novotná.

McNeil and Nagelsen lost in the quarter-finals to Catherine Suire and Catherine Tanvier.

Novotná and Smylie lost in the semi-finals to Claudia Kohde-Kilsch and Helena Suková.

Ann Henricksson and Christiane Jolissaint won in the final 7–6, 4–6, 6–3 against Kohde-Kilsch and Suková.

Seeds
Champion seeds are indicated in bold text while text in italics indicates the round in which those seeds were eliminated. The top four seeded teams received byes into the second round.

Draw

Final

Top half

Bottom half

References
 1988 New South Wales Open Women's Doubles Draw

Women's Doubles
Doubles